Nongong is a town, or eup in Dalseong County, Daegu, South Korea. The township Nongong-myeon was upgraded to the town Nongong-eup in 1996. Dalseong County Office and Nongong Town Office are located in Geumpo-ri. Nam-ri and Buk-ri, which include Dalseong Industrial Complex 1, are crowded with people.

Communities
Nongong-eup is divided into 9 villages (ri).

References

External links
Official website 

Dalseong County
Towns and townships in Daegu